William Rust may refer to:

William Rust (journalist) (1903–1949), British communist activist and newspaper editor
William A. Rust (1846–1903), Wisconsin state senator
William Ross Rust, president of the Tacoma Smelter and Refining Company
William Ross Rust House, named after William Ross Rust
William Rust Summit, a mountain summit in California